The 2019 Tashkent Open was a WTA International tennis tournament played on outdoor hard courts. It was the 21st and final edition of the Tashkent Open, on the 2019 WTA Tour. It took place at the Olympic Tennis School in Tashkent, Uzbekistan, between September 23 and 28, 2019.

Points and prize money

Point distribution

Prize money

1 Qualifiers prize money is also the Round of 32 prize money
* per team

Singles main-draw entrants

Seeds 

 1 Rankings as of September 16, 2019

Other entrants 
The following players received wildcards into the singles main draw:
  Nigina Abduraimova
  Akgul Amanmuradova
  Sabina Sharipova

The following players received entry using protected rankings:
  Denisa Allertová
  Kateryna Bondarenko

The following players received entry from the qualifying draw:
  Harriet Dart
  Olga Govortsova
  Tereza Martincová
  Liudmila Samsonova

Withdrawals 
Before the tournament
  Timea Bacsinszky → replaced by  Tímea Babos
  Mona Barthel → replaced by  Anna Kalinskaya
  Ivana Jorović → replaced by  Katarzyna Kawa
  Anna Karolína Schmiedlová → replaced by  Greet Minnen

Retirements
  Jeļena Ostapenko (gastrointestinal illness)

Doubles main-draw entrants

Seeds 

1 Rankings as of September 16, 2019

Other entrants 
The following pairs received wildcards into the doubles main draw:
 Nigina Abduraimova /  Akgul Amanmuradova
 Vitalia Diatchenko /  Sabina Sharipova

Withdrawals 
During the tournament
 Anna Kalinskaya (gastrointestinal illness)

Retirements 
 Greet Minnen (back injury)

Champions

Singles 

  Alison Van Uytvanck def.  Sorana Cîrstea, 6–2, 4–6, 6–4

Doubles 

  Hayley Carter /  Luisa Stefani def.  Dalila Jakupović /  Sabrina Santamaria, 6–3, 7–6(7–4)

References

External links 
 

 
2019
2019 in Uzbekistani sport
Tashkent Open
Tashkent Open